A referendum on banning politicians and civil servants from having bank accounts or companies based in tax havens was held in Ecuador on 19 February 2017, alongside general elections. The proposal was approved by voters, giving officials one year to transfer their assets or be removed from their posts.

The question on the ballot was "Do you agree that, for those holding a popularly elected office or for public servants, there should be a prohibition on holding assets or capital, of any nature, in tax havens?"

Classification of tax havens
In preparation for the referendum, the Ecuadorian Internal Revenue Service issued a resolution outlining the criteria for a jurisdiction to be considered a tax haven, establishing two categories: Preferential tax regimes, and low tax jurisdictions. A preferential tax regime was classed as a jurisdiction whose effective tax rate is below 60% in relation to the Ecuadorian corporate income tax (CIT) rate of 13.2%. A low tax jurisdiction was classed as having an effective tax rate below 60% in relation to the Ecuadorian CIT of 13.2% and no substantial economic activity. The IRS may remove a country from their list of tax havens if it reforms its tax policy, if it enforces a treaty to avoid double taxation, including a special information exchange clause, or if its laws do not include banking confidentiality, securities or other regulations that prohibit sharing information with the Ecuadorian IRS.

Along with this definition, the Ecuadorian IRS published a list of countries which currently meet the definition of a tax haven under their law. This list included 28 jurisdictions in the Americas, 19 in Oceania, 16 in Europe, 13 in Asia, 9 in Africa and two other island territories.

Campaign
Outgoing President Rafael Correa stated that he would campaign in favour of the proposal, having previously stated that tax havens were one of the biggest issues for democracy.

Results

Notes

References

2017
2017 referendums
2017 in Ecuador
Tax avoidance
International taxation